Ðani Kovač (born 13 February 1939) is a Yugoslav sprinter. He competed in the men's 4 × 400 metres relay at the 1960 Summer Olympics.

References

1939 births
Living people
Athletes (track and field) at the 1960 Summer Olympics
Athletes (track and field) at the 1964 Summer Olympics
Yugoslav male sprinters
Yugoslav male hurdlers
Olympic athletes of Yugoslavia
Place of birth missing (living people)